Pavel Vítek (born 30 September 1962) is a Czech singer and actor.

He performed in the musicals Les Misérables (as Marius), Miss Saigon (as John), Grease (as Teen Angel), and in the play Romeo and Juliet (as Mercutio).

He is also a pop star in the Czech Republic with eight albums, five top ten hits, and two number one hits.

Vitek is the first celebrity in the Czech Republic to publicly disclose his homosexuality to a newspaper (October, 2000). In July 2006 he married his long-time boyfriend Janis Sidovský in a Civil Partnership ceremony in Karlštejn Castle near Prague.

References

External links
 
 

1962 births
Living people
Czech male stage actors
Gay singers
Actors from Olomouc
Czech gay actors
Czech gay musicians
Czech LGBT singers
Musicians from Olomouc
20th-century Czech LGBT people
21st-century Czech LGBT people
20th-century Czech male singers
21st-century Czech male singers